Strom Glacier is a steep valley glacier flowing northeast from the north side of Mount Fridtjof Nansen to the head of the Ross Ice Shelf, flanked on the northwest by the Duncan Mountains and on the southeast by the Herbert Range. The glacier derives its name from "Strom Camp" near its foot, occupied during December 1929 by the Byrd Antarctic Expedition geological party under Gould. Strom Camp was named by that party for Sverre Strom, first mate of the ship City of New York, who remained ashore as a member of the winter party and headed the snowmobile party which hauled supplies in support of the two field parties.

Glaciers of Amundsen Coast